"Dance with the Devil" is a solo drum instrumental by Cozy Powell based on the song "Third Stone from the Sun" by Jimi Hendrix. It was recorded as Cozy Powell's session work for RAK was taking off, and as his band Bedlam was finishing. The bass player on the track is Suzi Quatro. The track was retitled "Dance with the Drums" for the South Africa release, and UK pressings issued for export to Denmark and Belgium came in picture sleeves, some on blue vinyl.

It reached No. 3 in the UK Singles Chart in January 1974. The track was Powell's only entry on the US Hot 100.

Charts

Samples
The song (and the background shouts) forms the basis for the intro of the song "Rasputin" and "Nightflight to Venus" by the group Boney M. 
Part of the song was used in Right Said Fred's song "I'm Too Sexy".

Cover versions
The song was later covered by drummer Mark Edwards (Steeler, Third Stage Alert, Lion) and released on his all-instrumental EP Code of Honor in 1985.

References

Songs about dancing
1973 singles
Rock instrumentals
RAK Records singles
Chrysalis Records singles
Cozy Powell songs
Songs written by Mickie Most
Song recordings produced by Mickie Most